This is a list of episodes of the 1972–1975 American television series Kung Fu, starring David Carradine as Kwai Chang Caine.

Series overview

Episodes

Pilot movie (1972)

Season 1 (1972–73)
(For the sake of the story's continuity and the logic of the wardrobe changes, it is advisable to watch the episodes according to the production codes instead of the broadcast order, especially in the third season. However, the best order for the last six episodes would be #166271, #166272, #166269, #166270, #166273, #166274)

Season 2 (1973–74)

Season 3 (1974–75)

See also
Kung Fu: The Legend Continues

References

External links
 
 Kung Fu at TV Guide

Lists of American action television series episodes
Lists of American Western (genre) television series episodes